The Ranger Award is an award available to youth in the Venturing program of the Boy Scouts of America, to encourage and recognize proficiency in skills.

Award
The medal is an antique silver colored roundel suspended from a white and green ribbon that is in turn suspended from a bar.  The medal is inscribed with a compass rose with the BSA universal badge at the top and the word RANGER at the bottom.  A powderhorn is in the center on a green enameled background.  The bar is inscribed with RANGER.  The Ranger bar is available as a separate item for informal uniform wear.  As of 2012, there is no square knot insignia and no plans to add one, as the Venturing Summit is the highest award in Venturing and thus the only award on par to have a knot with Eagle Scout (Scouts BSA program), Quartermaster (Sea Scout program), and Arrow of Light (Cub Scout program).

Requirements
To earn the Ranger Award, Venturers must complete requirements similar to Merit Badges, although they are more difficult to complete.  For example, an Eagle Scout must earn the first aid merit badge, by becoming certified in standard first aid.  To earn the first aid elective, a Ranger must complete a 24-hour emergency first aid course and the Red Cross When Help is Delayed Module.  There are eight requirements, called Core Requirements, that must be earned by all Ranger Candidates.  In addition, a Venturer must complete four out of eighteen requirements, called Electives.

Core requirements
To earn the Ranger Award, all Venturers must earn the following awards:
 First Aid
 Communications
 Cooking
 Emergency Preparedness
 Land Navigation
 Leave No Trace
 Wilderness Survival
 Conservation

Electives
To earn the Ranger Award, Venturers must earn four of the following:
 Backpacking
 Cave Exploring
 Cycling/Mountain Biking
 Ecology
 Equestrian
 First Aid (Different from the Core Requirement)
 Fishing
 Hunting
 Lifesaver (Lifeguarding)
 Mountaineering
 Outdoor Living History
 Physical Fitness
 Plants and Wildlife
 Project COPE
 Scuba
 Shooting Sports
 Watercraft
 Winter Sports

Origins
The first Ranger Medal was issued between 1946 and 1949 as part of the BSA's Explorer Scout Program.  Although the Ranger program was officially discontinued in 1949, Explorer Scouts could continue work on the Ranger Award until 1951.  A total of 2,782 Explorers earned the original Ranger Award between 1944 and 1951.

The Ranger Award was re-introduced by the BSA in 1998 as part of the new Venturing program.  Adam Snyder of Waukegan, Illinois was the first Venturer to earn the Ranger Award in 1999.

For Leaders
Scout Leaders interested in the Ranger award can take Powder Horn.

References

Advancement and recognition in the Boy Scouts of America